White Stag is an album released by Phil Elverum under the name Mount Eerie, on May 2, 2009. The album centers around the building of the same name where Eleverum recorded the album and briefly lived.

Recording and release 
Writer Matthew Stadler, who led public programming and the Publication Studio at White Stag was the one who conceived of  the project and subsequently contacted Elverum.  Stadler's only stipulation was that the project be directly related to building. Elverum recorded the album during a week long residency at the White Stag building from March 30, 2009 to April 6, 2009. Elverum used a Marshall amp and a 4 track analogue tape to record the album.

Elverum performed the album in its entirety on May 2, 2009, in the White Stag building. He then collaborated with a group of graduate students to package the album and release the album. The album was released in a limited CD-R which included a poster with the lyrics printed onto it. Only a couple hundred copies were made.

Music 
The album is a mix of traditional songs and field recordings. Elverum chose to create a "fake history", focusing on the mythology of the building rather than presenting an accurate representation. In an interview with Portland Mercury he stated that "The songs are about how hard it is to maintain a relationship with memory when something bad has happened" noting the building's history with the oppression of Native Americans and the divide between the rich and poor.

Track listing

Personnel 

 Phil Elverum – songwriting, vocals

References 

2009 albums
Albums recorded in a home studio
Mount Eerie albums